Raydio is the debut album by the band Raydio in 1978 on Arista Records. The album peaked at No. 8 on the Billboard Top Soul LPs chart and No. 27 on the Billboard 200 chart. Raydio was certified Gold in the US by the RIAA.

History
Released in 1978 on Arista Records, it featured two hit pop singles: "Jack and Jill" (number 8 pop, number 5 R&B, number 11 in the UK) and "Is This A Love Thing" (number 20 R&B, number 27 UK).

Record World said that the single "Honey I'm Rich" "wrives along on a very Spinner-ish vocal hook."

Track listing
Adapted from album's text.

Personnel
Adapted from album's text.

Raydio
Vincent Bonham – vocals
Arnell Carmichael – vocals
Ray Parker Jr. – guitars, vocals, recording engineer, mixing
Jerry Knight – bass, vocals

Additional personnel
Jack Ashford – tambourine
Ollie E. Brown – drums, percussion
Charles Fearing – guitars
Horatio Gordon – saxophone
Ken Peterson – trumpet
Melvin "Wah Wah" Ragin – guitars, voice box
Sylvester Rivers – piano
Sylvia Duckworth, Valerie Jones, Francine Pearlman, Rochelle Runnels, Janice Williams - background vocals
Bernie Grundman - mastering
John E. Barrett, David Gahr, Free Lance Photographers - photography
Steve Feldman - art director

Charts

Weekly charts

Year-end charts

Singles

References

External links
 Raydio at Discogs

1978 debut albums
Arista Records albums
Raydio albums
Albums produced by Ray Parker Jr.